A deficit is the amount by which a sum falls short of some reference amount.

Economics
 Balance of payments deficit, when the balance of payments is negative
 Government budget deficit
 Deficit spending, the amount by which spending exceeds revenue
 Primary deficit, the pure deficit derived after deducting the interest payments 
 Structural and cyclical deficit, parts of the public sector deficit
 Income deficit, the difference between family income and the poverty threshold
 Trade deficit, when the value of imports exceed the value of exports fiscal deficit of that year= total borrowing by government

Psychology
 Attention deficit hyperactivity disorder, a developmental disorder
 Cognitive deficit, any characteristic that acts as a barrier to cognitive performance

Other
 Defect (geometry), angular deficit
 Déficit, a 2007 Mexican film by Gael García Bernal

See also 

 Government debt, the accumulated amount of deficits; "debt" and "deficit" are sometimes confused.
 Deficit Reduction Act (disambiguation)
 Deficit reduction
 Fiscal (disambiguation)